John Zeiler (born November 21, 1982) is an American former professional ice hockey right winger. He last played for the EC Kassel Huskies of the DEL2. Zeiler was drafted 132nd overall by the Phoenix Coyotes in the 2002 NHL Entry Draft.

Playing career
Zeiler graduated from Thomas Jefferson High School in Jefferson Hills, Pennsylvania. His junior training was with Sioux City of the USHL and with the Pittsburgh Hornets AAA program. Prior to the NHL, he played college hockey at St. Lawrence.

In 2007, Zeiler signed a one-year contract with the Kings and made his NHL debut on February 17, 2007 against the Anaheim Ducks. Five days later, he scored his first NHL goal against the Vancouver Canucks.

After five seasons within the Kings organization, Zeiler left to sign abroad in the German DEL, with Augsburger Panther on August 9, 2011.

Personal information
Zeiler was cast as an extra in Tooth Fairy, a 2010 film starring Dwayne Johnson.

Career statistics

Awards and honors

References

External links

1982 births
Living people
People from Jefferson Hills, Pennsylvania
Sportspeople from the Pittsburgh metropolitan area
Ice hockey players from Pennsylvania
American men's ice hockey right wingers
Arizona Coyotes draft picks
Augsburger Panther players
Kassel Huskies players
Los Angeles Kings players
Lubbock Cotton Kings players
Manchester Monarchs (AHL) players
St. Lawrence Saints men's ice hockey players
San Antonio Rampage players
Sioux City Musketeers players